"Phyllobrostis" argillosa is a moth in the Lyonetiidae family. It was described from a single male from Kranspoort near Pretoria. It is misplaced in Lyonetiidae and even in Yponomeutoidea. The species should probably be placed in the superfamily Tineoidea, probably in Tineidae.

External links
Revision of the genus Phyllobrostis Staudinger, 1859 (Lepidoptera, Lyonetiidae)

Endemic moths of South Africa
Lyonetiidae
Moths of Africa